Peter Michael Brillmacher was a German Jesuit who was active in preaching Catholic doctrine in the early part of the Counter Reformation.

References

16th-century German Jesuits